Standards is a rock album by English singer, songwriter and musician Lloyd Cole released on 21 June 2013 by Tapete Records. It is Cole's tenth solo album under his own name, although only his second since 1995 to feature a full band of additional musicians.

Cole produced the album himself with additional mixing by Olaf Opal and Joerg Siegeler.

Background 

Cole says that he was inspired by the energy and vibrancy of  Bob Dylan's album Tempest, which surprised him considering Dylan's age. Cole said: 

The album is also notable for its emphasis on electric guitar; Cole had established himself as an acoustic and folk musician through his most recent studio releases and touring predominantly as solo performer with an acoustic guitar. 

The band assembled by Cole includes, among others, the rhythm section from his debut self-titled solo album (1990) and his follow up Don't Get Weird on Me Babe (1991) in the form of drummer Fred Maher and bassist Matthew Sweet. Blair Cowan a former member of the Commotions plays keyboards and Joan Wasser plays piano and supplies additional vocals. Cole's own son William plays guitar on the album including a solo on the track 'It's Late'.  William also appeared in the video for the song 'Period Piece'.

Cole wrote 10 original songs for the album alone before taking them to the studio to play with the other musicians, he only had the guitar parts to play as he had not recorded demo tracks prior to entering the studio. The album features a cover of a John Hartford song called "California Earthquake," which Cole mistakenly believed to have been a composition by John Phillips of  The Mamas & the Papas after hearing a version sung by Cass Elliot.

The album was recorded in Los Angeles, Easthampton and New York and mixed in Bochum.

Financing 

The recording of the album was partially financed through pre-sales of a deluxe limited edition of the album; the purchasers were also credited as executive producers of the album and received copies before general release. The deluxe limited edition of the album was a pre-sale exclusive and featured an additional disc of outtakes, a handwritten lyric book, and a personal note of thanks from Cole, as well as the complete album. A target of 600 box sales was successfully reached before the scheduled deadline. The rest of the recording budget was provided by  Tapete Records and Cole himself.

Critical reception 

The album has been well received by critics and reviewers. The Independent described it as 'what may be [Cole's] best album... he's devised a sound replete with twisting, cyclical guitar lines and tints of keyboards.'   The Sunday Times wrote that 'Lloyd Cole's latest album is fine advertisement for approaching the act of writing in contemplative way. Record Collector said of the album: 'glittering literate... with its steely interlaced guitars and high/low cultural references is like Television and Lou Reed on a road trip in a top-down convertible, with a stack of jazz mags in the boot. The magazine Mojo described the album as 'captivating' saying the tracks 'form a charming, intriguing whole, sometimes with telling simplicity.' 

Reviews have also compared the album both positively and negatively to his work with the Commotions. The Arts Desk described it as 'an album that ticks a lot of the old boxes, with some lovely dad-rock flourishes. While Roy Wilkinson writing in Mojo said the album harks back to the Commotions' second album Easy Pieces, dubbing it archetypal Cole. In contrast, The Telegraph said 'Each song is carefully crafted, filled with a kind of mordant, misanthropic wit that skates over deep emotions' and that Cole fails to 'recapture the firebrand innocence of his early pop classics.'

Track listing

Personnel 

Musicians
 Lloyd Cole – guitar, keyboards, vocals, production 
 Matthew Sweet – bass guitar, backing vocals
 Fred Maher – drums
 Blair Cowan – keyboards
 Mark Schwaber – guitar, harmony vocals
 Will Cole – guitar, harmony vocals
 Matt Cullen – guitar 
 Joan Wasser – piano, harmony vocals
 Dave Derby – harmony vocals
 Mike Wyzik – percussion

Technical personnel
 Olaf Opal – mixing
 Joerg Siegeler – mixing
 Hosuk Lee-Makiyama – artwork design

Chart positions

References

External links
Official website album information
Record label artist and album profile

2013 albums
Lloyd Cole albums
Tapete Records albums